In mathematics, a radial function is a real-valued function defined on a Euclidean space Rn whose value at each point depends only on the distance between that point and the origin. The distance is usually the Euclidian distance.  For example, a radial function Φ in two dimensions has the form

where φ is a function of a single non-negative real variable.  Radial functions are contrasted with spherical functions, and any descent function (e.g., continuous and rapidly decreasing) on Euclidean space can be decomposed into a series consisting of radial and spherical parts: the solid spherical harmonic expansion.

A function is radial if and only if it is invariant under all rotations leaving the origin fixed.  That is, ƒ is radial if and only if

for all , the special orthogonal group in n dimensions.  This characterization of radial functions makes it possible also to define radial distributions.  These are distributions S on Rn such that

for every test function φ and rotation ρ.

Given any (locally integrable) function ƒ, its radial part is given by averaging over spheres centered at the origin.  To wit,

It follows essentially by Fubini's theorem that a locally integrable function has a well-defined radial part at almost every r.

The Fourier transform of a radial function is also radial, and so radial functions play a vital role in Fourier analysis.  Furthermore, the Fourier transform of a radial function typically has stronger decay behavior at infinity than non-radial functions: for radial functions bounded in a neighborhood of the origin, the Fourier transform decays faster than R−(n−1)/2.  The Bessel functions are a special class of radial function that arise naturally in Fourier analysis as the radial eigenfunctions of the Laplacian; as such they appear naturally as the radial portion of the Fourier transform.

See also
 Radial basis function

References

.

Harmonic analysis
Rotational symmetry
Types of functions